A violent, high-end EF4 multiple-vortex tornado destroyed portions of Tuscaloosa and Birmingham, Alabama, as well as smaller communities and rural areas between the two cities, during the late afternoon and early evening of April 27, 2011. It is one of the costliest tornadoes on record. It was one of the 360 tornadoes in the 2011 Super Outbreak, the largest tornado outbreak in United States history. The tornado reached a maximum path width of  during its track through Tuscaloosa, and once again when it crossed I-65 north of Birmingham, and attained estimated winds of  shortly after passing through the city. It then went on to impact parts of Birmingham at high-end EF4 intensity before dissipating. This was the third tornado to strike the city of Tuscaloosa in the past decade, and the second in two weeks.

Meteorological synopsis
   
On April 23, the Storm Prediction Center (SPC) began monitoring the potential for a substantial severe weather outbreak in the extended range. As a shortwave trough tracked across portions of the Mid-South and southeastern United States, moderate instability and strong wind shear ahead of a trailing cold front was expected to promote the development of supercell thunderstorms capable of producing tornadoes, large hail, and damaging winds. Two days before the event, on April 25, the SPC issued a moderate risk of severe weather encompassing portions of central and eastern Kentucky, middle and eastern Tennessee, northeast Mississippi, central and northern Alabama, and northwest Georgia. Due to the combination of rich low-level moisture, strong shear, and focused large-scale ascent, there was relatively high confidence across the outlined area for strong tornadoes – a tornado rated EF2 or higher on the Enhanced Fujita scale – and widespread damaging winds. By the morning of April 27, the SPC upgraded to a high risk of severe weather, noting that a dangerous tornado outbreak capable of producing several violent – EF4 tornado or stronger on the Enhanced Fujita scale – and long-track tornadoes was expected.

Shortly before 12:00 CDT, the probability of tornadoes within 25 miles of a location was increased even further to 45%, a level exceeding even typical high risk standards, for an area including Tuscaloosa. The forecast continued to emphasize the risk of strong/violent and very damaging tornadoes, as confidence increased even further regarding the risk for an extreme, high-end tornado outbreak. Throughout the afternoon hours, in the wake of an earlier mesoscale convective system, the airmass across western and northern portions of Alabama began to quickly destabilize, with mixed layer convective available potential energy (CAPE) estimated in the 2500–4000 j/kg range and low-level dewpoints of 70–72 °F surging northward from Louisiana. Meanwhile, the wind shear environment became substantially more favorable as an 80–100 kn mid-level jet ejected eastward into the region. At 1:45 p.m. CDT (18:45 UTC), a Particularly Dangerous Situation (PDS) tornado watch was issued for much of Alabama, northwest Georgia, southeast Mississippi, and southern middle Tennessee, with a >95% probability of at least two tornadoes and one or more strong tornadoes. Shortly thereafter, at 3:09 p.m. CDT (20:09 UTC), the National Weather Service office in Jackson, Mississippi issued the first tornado warning on the supercell that would eventually produce the Tuscaloosa–Birmingham tornado.

Tornado summary

The supercell produced a large wedge tornado in rural Greene County, Alabama, which tracked towards the adjacent Tuscaloosa County at EF2 intensity, uprooting numerous trees and causing minor damage to structures. Near Union at 4:50 p.m. CDT, footage of the wedge tornado was captured by meteorologist John Oldshue during a storm chase for Birmingham ABC affiliate WBMA-LD/WCFT-TV/WJSU-TV (channels 58, 33, and 40 – "ABC 33/40"), which broadcast Oldshue's live video of the tornado as he was tracking it outside of town. This was the first video evidence that the tornado had touched the ground; the video, along with NEXRAD evidence of a tornado debris signature, prompted the National Weather Service office in Birmingham to declare a tornado emergency. Rapidly intensifying, the tornado moved towards the southern and eastern portions of Tuscaloosa at around 5:10 p.m. CDT (22:10 UTC). Skycams operated by Tuscaloosa-based television station WVUA-CA (channel 7) as well as Birmingham Fox affiliate WBRC (channel 6) and ABC 33/40, and a ground-based camera crew with CBS affiliate WIAT (channel 42) captured video of the tornado as it struck Tuscaloosa. The ABC 33/40 feed was periodically disrupted due to power outages caused by wind damage to electrical transformers. As it entered the city, Skycam footage showed surface condensation in the tornado, outside of a visible debris cloud, had briefly lifted; a discernible wedge-shaped condensation funnel, with occasional horizontal and vertical subvortices, subsequently touched back down at the surface as it began moving into neighborhoods in southern Tuscaloosa.

The tornado entered the southern portion of Tuscaloosa as a low-end EF4 and crossed 35th Street, completely destroying a cell phone tower and several warehouses in an industrial area. It passed within a half mile of the Tuscaloosa Police Department Headquarters, forcing the evacuation of the dispatch personnel from the third floor offices until the storm passed. At that same time, the Tuscaloosa County Emergency Management Office sustained a direct hit and was totally destroyed along with most of their equipment and vehicles but with no injuries to the staff present. The tornado then ripped through the neighborhoods of Rosedale and Forest Lake, leveling and sweeping away numerous poorly-anchored homes. Several apartment complexes were entirely destroyed in this area, and a few two-story apartment buildings were completely reduced to rubble. The tornado crossed the intersection of 15th Street and McFarland Boulevard, and numerous businesses and restaurants near the University Mall were completely flattened at low-end EF4 strength, and vehicles were either tossed around or destroyed.  The nearby Cedar Crest subdivision was devastated as numerous block-foundation homes were leveled. The tornado maintained its strength as it continued through the neighborhood of Alberta City, leveling and sweeping away numerous block-foundation homes, and completely flattening two more apartment buildings and a shopping center along University Boulevard. As the tornado exited the Alberta City section, the Chastain Manor Apartments (which were nailed, rather than bolted to their foundations) were completely destroyed and partially swept away. A well-anchored clubhouse on the property was mostly swept away and its remains were scattered into a pond, even though the structure had lacked interior walls. A nearby manhole cover was removed from its drain and thrown into a ravine.

Every tree was snapped in this area, including those within deep ravines. As it crossed Hurricane Creek, it tore apart a large metal railroad trestle, and a  metal truss support structure was thrown  up on a nearby hill. It continued through a dense forest towards Birmingham, this time downing thousands of trees and flattening more rural homes. A total of 44 people were killed in the Tuscaloosa area.

After causing massive timber damage in rural areas, the tornado entered Jefferson County and rapidly intensified to its maximum intensity and width. Many stations, including WIAT, the WBMA trimulcast, CBS affiliate WTVY (channel 4) in Dothan and NBC affiliate WSFA (channel 12) in Montgomery, showed television cameras capturing the event as the tornado – which appeared wider than its estimated width during that section of the path as the condensation funnel was partially obscured by a debris cloud and a dense rain shaft – moved east-northeast across the western and northern suburbs of Birmingham at high-end EF4 strength around 6:00 p.m. CDT (23:00 UTC). Several suburbs in the area sustained catastrophic damage from the tornado as it tore through the west side of Birmingham, resulting in twenty fatalities. The suburbs of Concord, Pleasant Grove, and McDonald Chapel, along with residential areas in northern Birmingham itself, were devastated. Extensive wind-rowing of debris was noted in Concord and Pleasant Grove, numerous trees were debarked, and some homes were swept away (though much of the debris remained next to the foundations and was not scattered, and most vehicles were not moved more than ). As the tornado moved across a coal yard in this area, a  coal car was thrown  through the air. Past the coal yard, the tornado weakened to EF2 intensity, but still was able to destroy numerous pier and beam foundations homes and several industrial warehouses in McDonald Chapel. A four-sided brick home in the area also had its roof torn off, but none of its exterior walls collapsed. Numerous homes, apartment buildings, and a large church sustained significant damage as the tornado entered Birmingham's city limits and impacted the neighborhood of Pratt City. Vehicles were also moved, albeit only several feet. The tornado then struck the suburb of Fultondale, damaging homes and businesses in town. Light poles were damaged along Interstate 65, and a Days Inn and several other commercial buildings sustained major damage along US 31 before the tornado began to rapidly narrow and weaken. Some additional EF0 to EF1 damage occurred before the tornado dissipated two miles north of Tarrant. A total of 20 people were killed throughout Birmingham and its surrounding suburbs.

The final rating of this tornado was a source of controversy, as some survey teams concluded EF5 damage, while others did not. The structures that were swept away by this tornado were either improperly anchored, lacked interior walls, or were surrounded by contextual damage not consistent with winds exceeding , and as a result an EF5 rating could not be applied. Early reports indicated 65 people were killed, with over 1,000 injured. However, this was revised to 64 deaths and more than 1,500 injuries. President Barack and First Lady Michelle Obama visited Tuscaloosa on April 29, taking a ground tour of some of the affected areas. Obama was quoted as saying that he had "never seen devastation like this." He stated further that he had already declared a federal state of emergency in Alabama.

Aftermath
By the time the tornado lifted northeast of Birmingham, it had left behind a path of destruction of  through Greene, Tuscaloosa and Jefferson counties. The tornado killed 64 people, including six University of Alabama students. It caused approximately $2.4 billion of property damage, surpassing the 1999 Bridge Creek–Moore tornado as the costliest single tornado in United States history at that time. Less than a month later, however, this number was surpassed by the Joplin, Missouri EF5 tornado, which caused $2.8 billion in damage.

The effects of the tornado arguably contributed to a decrease in affordable housing in what has been called "an uneven recovery" for Tuscaloosa.

See also
 
2011 Super Outbreak
Tornadoes of 2011
2011 Hackleburg–Phil Campbell tornado – A similarly deadly tornado that was part of the same outbreak.
List of North American tornadoes and tornado outbreaks
Tornado intensity and damage
List of F5 and EF5 tornadoes
Tornado records
December 2000 Tuscaloosa tornado

References

External links
 Interview with Storm Chaser of April 27 Tuscaloosa Tornado
 Full video of this tornado taken by the above storm chaser from Tuscaloosa University Mall parking lot
 Full episode of Discovery Channel's Storm Chasers about the Tuscaloosa Tornado

F4 tornadoes by date
Tuscaloosa-Birmingham
Tornadoes in Alabama
Tuscaloosa-Birmingham
Tuscaloosa, Alabama
Tornado,2011-04-27,Tuscaloosa-Birmingham
2011 in Alabama
 Tuscaloosa-Birmingham Tornado

es:Tornado de 2011 en Tuscaloosa-Birmingham
it:Tornado di Tuscaloosa-Birmingham del 2011
ms:Puting beliung Mei 2011
vi:Bão lốc xoáy tại Tuscaloosa-Birmingham, 2011